Rita Garay (born 30 June 1971) is a Puerto Rican swimmer. She competed at the 1988 Summer Olympics and the 1992 Summer Olympics.

References

External links
 

1971 births
Living people
Puerto Rican female swimmers
Olympic swimmers of Puerto Rico
Swimmers at the 1988 Summer Olympics
Swimmers at the 1992 Summer Olympics
Pan American Games competitors for Puerto Rico
Swimmers at the 1987 Pan American Games
Swimmers at the 1991 Pan American Games
Place of birth missing (living people)
Central American and Caribbean Games gold medalists for Puerto Rico
Central American and Caribbean Games medalists in swimming
Competitors at the 1990 Central American and Caribbean Games
20th-century Puerto Rican women